Jack Anderson (born 2 June 1987 in Brisbane) is an Australian cyclist.

Major results

2009
 1st  Time trial, Oceania Under-23 Road Championships
 1st Stage 1 (TTT) Tour of Wellington
 1st Stage 1 (TTT) Tour de Singkarak
2010
 2nd Time trial, National Road Championships
 3rd Ronde Pévéloise
 6th Overall Mi-Août en Bretagne
 9th Duo Normand (with Fredrik Johansson)
2011
 1st Stage 1 (TTT) Czech Cycling Tour
2013
 Oceania Road Championships
3rd  Road race
7th Time trial
 7th Overall Tour de Hokkaido
2014
 1st  Points classification Herald Sun Tour
 Oceania Road Championships
6th Road race
10th Time trial
2015
 7th The REV Classic
 10th Overall New Zealand Cycle Classic

References

External links

1987 births
Living people
Australian male cyclists